Dave Sands (born David Ritchie; 4 February 1926 – 11 August 1952) was an Indigenous Australian boxer.

The man the Americans called the "boxer with the educated left hand" received his due when he was inducted into the World Boxing Hall of Fame in 1998 at a ceremony held in Los Angeles, recognised as one of the greatest boxers never to have won a world title.

Dave was the 2009 Inductee for the Australian National Boxing Hall of Fame Veterans category.

Early life
Born at Burnt Bridge Mission Kempsey, New South Wales, fifth of eight children of George Ritchie, a rodeo-rider and timber-cutter of mixed Aboriginal and European descent, and his Aboriginal wife Mabel, née Russell.

Sands' brothers Clement, Percival, George, Alfred and Russell also boxed, emulating their father and their maternal great-uncle Bailey Russell, a noted bare-knuckle fighter. In 1939 Percy travelled to Newcastle to train with Tom Maguire, At the age of 15 Sands joined Percy training with Maguire and both lived at Maguire's gym. Dave and his five brothers took on the Sands name, taken off a train guard "Snowy" Sands who helped Percy Ritchie, travel to fight fare free in 1940.

Career
Without Maguire's knowledge, Dave fought a four-round preliminary bout in August 1941 at Newcastle Stadium, swinging his way to victory in the first round. Maguire disapproved, but quickly transformed him into a skilled boxer. By the end of 1942 he had knocked out a dozen opponents at Newcastle. On 11 August 1945 he married 18-year-old Bessie Emma Burns at St Paul's Church of England, Stockton, New South Wales.

Sands was soon boxing in twelve-round matches before excited crowds of up to ten thousand people in Brisbane and Sydney. In May 1946 he defeated Jack Kirkham for the Australian middleweight title. Three months later he knocked out Jack Johnson in four rounds to become national light-heavyweight champion. The rematches were even more one-sided: Kirkham was defeated in five rounds and Johnson fell after 2½ minutes of furious punching. By 1948 Sands had beaten all his local opponents and most American 'imports'. His mauling of a French fighter Tony Toniolo in less than two minutes in February 1949 led the English promoter Jack Solomons to take an interest in him.

Despite an enthusiastic reception from the British press, Sands began his campaign for a world title disastrously. In London on 4 April 1949, while suffering from a swollen, recently vaccinated arm, he was outpointed by Tommy Yarosz. Fifteen days later Sands won, dismally, against a spoiler, Lucien Caboche. Maguire then moved him to Newcastle-upon-Tyne, where friendly locals and a promoter Joe Shepherd restored his confidence. After two solid victories, he returned to London and in July thrashed the much fancied Robert Villemain in the 'fight of the year'. On 6 September Sands demolished Dick Turpin in 2 minutes 35 seconds for the British Empire middleweight title.

Shortly after his triumphal return to Australia in November 1949, Sands survived a serious accident when the steering on his motorcar failed and the vehicle somersaulted into a creek. Over the next eighteen months he contested and won nine fights, one of them a fifteen-rounder in September 1950 in which he took the Australian heavyweight championship from Alf Gallagher. Sands had become a leading contender for the world middleweight title and Maguire vainly sought to arrange a bout with the American champion Sugar Ray Robinson. In the tricky maze of international boxing promotion, his efforts were marked by a paper chase of offers and counter-offers. Sands defeated Mel Brown in London in July 1951 in a preliminary to a title fight between Robinson and another contender Randolph Turpin. Had Maguire's negotiations succeeded, Sands would have been in Turpin's place and probably would have beaten an unfit Robinson, as did Turpin.

In October 1951, Sands won two fights in the United States. Back home, he hoped for a world title-bout, but he was estranged from Maguire. A new manager Bede Kerr reopened discussions with Robinson's connections, but the chance never came.

Death
On 11 August 1952, the truck Sands was driving with 15 passengers overturned at roadworks near Dungog, New South Wales. Sands died of head and internal injuries that evening in the local hospital and was buried at Sandgate Cemetery, near Newcastle, New South Wales. His wife, and their son and two daughters survived him; their third daughter was born in November. Sands had earned about £30,000, but it went on manager's fees, travel costs, tax, family expenses and generosity to his kin. A public appeal raised more than £2500, sufficient to pay off his Stockton home and create a trust fund for his family.

Professional boxing record

Titles

References

Sources
Pictures held and digitised as part of the Arnold Thomas boxing collection by the National Library of Australia  
 Dave Sands, Empire and Australian Middleweight Champion and Tom Maguire, trainer
 British Empire title bout, Dave Sands, 11 st. 5 lb., K.O. Dick Turpin, 11 st. 3¾ lb., in the first round at Harringay Arena, England, 6 September 1949
 Dave Sands (left), 11 st. 7¾ lb. v. Henry Brimm, 11 st. 5½ lb., at Rushcutter's Bay Stadium, 8 August 1950

External links

1926 births
1952 deaths
Indigenous Australian boxers
Middleweight boxers
People from New South Wales
Australian male boxers
Road incident deaths in New South Wales
Sport Australia Hall of Fame inductees